Dyschirius fulgidus is a species of ground beetle in the subfamily Scaritinae. It was described by Victor Motschulsky in 1850.

References

fulgidus
Beetles described in 1850